Nakhon Sawan Airport, is an airport in Nakhon Sawan, the capital city of Nakhon Sawan Province, Thailand.

See also
List of airports in Thailand

References

External links

Buildings and structures in Nakhon Sawan province
Airports in Thailand